Postal codes in Croatia are 5 digit numeric. There are 20 two digit zones defined. Zagreb City and Zagreb County have one, each other first level administrative country subdivision, i.e. one of the counties of Croatia, has its own range. 

From the 10 possible 1 digit ranges only 5 are assigned: 
 1 Zagreb region,
 2 Southern Croatia,
 3 Eastern Croatia,
 4 Central Croatia except Zagreb region,
 5 Western Croatia.

In the range 1xxxx only one two digit range namely 10xxx is assigned, the maximum of subranges exists is in the 4xxxx range with 7 ranges.

Three cities have a postal code with 4 zeros: 10000 Zagreb, 20000 Dubrovnik,  40000 Čakovec.

Old system 

After independence, Croatia went on to use the 5 digit numeric postal codes once assigned to the Socialist Republic of Croatia (within SFR Yugoslavia). The system had assigned the ranges 4xxxx and 5xxxx to the republic.

See also 
 List of postal codes in Croatia
 ISO 3166-2:HR
 NUTS of Croatia
 Telephone numbers in Croatia

External links 
 https://web.archive.org/web/20070207042037/http://www.posta.hr/main.aspx?id=148&trazi=1&vrsta=2
 https://web.archive.org/web/20110720064604/http://www.t-com.hr/privatni/telefon/pozivi/pozivni/medumjesni.asp telephone prefix map

Croatia
Communications in Croatia